Twilight Zone: Rod Serling's Lost Classics is a 1994 American made-for-television fantasy supernatural horror film consisting of two stories by Rod Serling. The film was co-produced by Serling's widow Carol Serling.  Reportedly, she found the two pieces in a trunk in the family's garage.

The first and shorter segment, entitled The Theatre, was expanded and scripted by Richard Matheson from a Serling outline.  It starred Gary Cole and Amy Irving.

The longer segment, Where The Dead Are, was a complete script Serling penned in 1968.  Patrick Bergin and Jack Palance starred. (Because it was written four years after the end of the original series, this was not originally a Twilight Zone story.) The tales have thematic echoes of stories about unnaturally prolonged longevity, such as Oscar Wilde's The Picture of Dorian Gray, Edgar Allan Poe's "The Facts in the Case of M. Valdemar" and H. P. Lovecraft's "Cool Air".

James Earl Jones hosted and narrated the special. He previously worked with Serling on the 1972 film The Man.

Plot

Introduction

The Theatre

Opening narration

Synopsis
A young woman, Melissa Sanders (Amy Irving), goes to the theatre to see the classic film His Girl Friday. She sees scenes from her own past involving her fiancé, James (Gary Cole). No one else can see these scenes. At first Melissa thinks it's a practical joke plotted by James, but when she returns to the theatre, she sees scenes of her future, in which she is killed by a bus on March 20. When she tells James about it, he assures her it will never happen. After it does happen, James visits the theatre and sees scenes from his own life.

Closing narration

Where the Dead Are

Opening narration

Synopsis
Three years after the American Civil War, a university professor and former Union Army surgeon, Dr. Benjamin Ramsey (Patrick Bergin), performs an appendectomy on a patient named O'Neill, who dies seconds later. Ramsey notices a severe skull fracture O'Neill had endured twelve years earlier, one that no one could have survived. Ramsey travels to a mysterious island to seek answers from Dr. Jeremy Wheaton (Jack Palance), who used to experiment with tissue regeneration. They discuss O'Neill, and Wheaton reveals that he has found a method to revive the dead; he explains that all of the apparently living people on the island were once dead. Later that night, Wheaton dies himself. The island's inhabitants, who have become accustomed to the impermanence of death, attack Ramsey, blaming him for Wheaton's inability to overcome his own death. Ramsey fends off the onslaught until morning, just as the ferry to the mainland arrives. Before leaving, he finds a note from Wheaton's niece in which she claims she also died and was revived by her uncle. Ramsey decides not tell his university colleagues about Wheaton's discovery, because the natural order requires that all living things must die.

Closing narration

References

External links
 

The Twilight Zone
1994 television films
1994 films
1994 fantasy films
1990s supernatural horror films
American fantasy films
American supernatural horror films
Films with screenplays by Richard Matheson
Films with screenplays by Rod Serling
Films set in 1868
Films set in 1994
Films set in Massachusetts
Resurrection in film
Films set in a movie theatre
Films set on islands
CBS network films
Films directed by Robert Markowitz
Films scored by Patrick Williams
1990s American films